Nikolay Fyodorovich Petrovsky (1837–1908) was the Russian consul-general in Kashgar from 1882 until 1902.

Petrovsky's main adversary during his time in Central Asia was George Macartney, his British counterpart. The competition between their two countries for influence in Central Asia is known as the Great Game. Between 1899 and June 1902 the two did not speak to each other, although both were on friendly terms with visiting travellers such as Sven Hedin. 

Petrovsky was very interested in collecting materials on the history of Xinjiang.  The Soviet scholar A.F. Usmanov suggested that 
he may have been instrumental in encouraging the veteran of Yaqub Beg's regime, Mulla Musa Sayrami, to write his Tārīkh-i amniyya ("History of Peace"), which to these days remains one of the best sources on the events in the region in the 19th century.

By the end of the 19th century, Petrovsky's personal collection included some texts in the then-unknown Tocharian languages, among other obscure dialects. The bulk of his collection was donated by Petrovsky to the Asiatic Museum in St. Petersburg.

See also 
 Mikhail Nikolayevich Muravyov
 Pyotr Kuzmich Kozlov

Footnotes

References 
Hopkirk, Peter (1980). Foreign Devils on the Silk Road: The Search for the Lost Cities and Treasures of Chinese Central Asia. Amherst: The University of Massachusetts Press. .
Meyer, Karl E. and Shareen Blair Brysac.  Tournament of Shadows: the Great Game and the Race for Empire in Central Asia (Basic Books: 2006) 
Red Vs. Blue: Going Global

Politicians of the Russian Empire
Explorers of Central Asia
Book and manuscript collectors
1837 births
1908 deaths
History of Xinjiang
Diplomats of the Russian Empire